Juan Herrera-Perla (born 31 October 1994) is a Salvadoran footballer who currently plays for Las Vegas Lights in the United Soccer League.

Career

College & Amateur
Herrera-Perla played four years of college soccer at Southwestern Assemblies of God University between 2014 and 2017, where he made 69 appearances, scored 8 goals and tallied 2 assists.

Professional
On 6 February 2018, Herrera-Perla signed with United Soccer League side Las Vegas Lights FC ahead of their inaugural 2018 season.

References

External links 
 

1994 births
Living people
Salvadoran footballers
American soccer players
American sportspeople of Salvadoran descent
Salvadoran expatriate footballers
Southwestern Assemblies of God Lions men's soccer players
Las Vegas Lights FC players
Association football defenders
Soccer players from Texas
USL Championship players
Southwestern Assemblies of God University alumni